Marika Karin Louise Lagercrantz (born 12 July 1954) is a Swedish actress. Since 2011, she has been Sweden's cultural attaché at the Berlin embassy in Germany.

Lagercrantz was born in Solna.  She is the daughter of Olof Lagercrantz, granddaughter of Hans Ruin, sister of David Lagercrantz, and cousin of Lars and Johan Lönnroth. Lagercrantz got her start in acting at Vår teater, a Swedish children's theatre, at six years of age. She participated in season 10 of Stjärnorna på slottet which is broadcast on SVT.

Filmography

Television
 Rapport till himlen (1994)
 Folk med ångest (2021)

References

1954 births
Living people
Swedish film actresses
Swedish television actresses
People from Solna Municipality
Swedish diplomats
Swedish expatriates in Germany
Swedish women diplomats

Marika